Rambo: First Blood Part II is a 1985 American action film directed by George P. Cosmatos and co-written by Sylvester Stallone, who also reprises his role as Vietnam War veteran John Rambo. A sequel to First Blood (1982), it is the second installment in the Rambo franchise, followed by Rambo III. It co-stars Richard Crenna, who reprises his role as Colonel Sam Trautman, along with Charles Napier, Julia Nickson, and Steven Berkoff.

The film's plot is inspired by the Vietnam War POW/MIA issue. In the movie, Rambo gets released from prison in a deal with the United States government to document the possible existence of missing POWs in Vietnam, but is given strict orders not to rescue any. When Rambo defies his orders, he is abandoned and forced once again to rely on his own brutal combat skills to save the POWs.

Despite mixed reviews, Rambo: First Blood Part II was a major global blockbuster, with an estimated $150 million sold in the United States, becoming the second highest grossing film at the domestic box office and the third highest grossing film worldwide in 1985. The film earned just $23 million less than Stallone's other blockbuster of 1985, Rocky IV. It has become one of the most recognized installments in the series, having inspired countless rip-offs, parodies, video games and imitations. In 2009, Entertainment Weekly ranked the movie number 23 on its list of "The Best Rock-'em, Sock-'em Movies of the Past 25 Years".

Plot 

Three years after the events in Hope, Washington, former US Army Green Beret John Rambo, now imprisoned at a penal labor facility, receives a visit from his former mission commander and old friend, Colonel Sam Trautman. With the Vietnam War now officially over, the public has become increasingly concerned over news that US POWs have been left in enemy custody in Vietnam. To placate their demands for action, the US government has authorized a solo infiltration mission to confirm the reports. Rambo agrees to undertake the operation in exchange for a pardon.

In Thailand, Rambo meets Marshall Murdock, the bureaucrat overseeing the operation. He is temporarily reinstated into the US Army and instructed only to take pictures of a suspected POW camp, not to attempt their rescue or engage any enemy personnel. Any POWs are to be retrieved by a better-equipped extraction team upon his return.

During his aerial insertion, Rambo's parachute gets caught in the airplane door, forcing him to cut himself free and jettison most of his equipment, leaving him with only his knives, bow and arrows. He meets his assigned contact, a female Vietnamese intelligence agent named Co Bao, who arranges for a local band of river pirates to take them upriver. Reaching the army camp, Rambo sneaks inside, spotting POWs. When he finds one of them tied to a cross-shaped post, suffering from exposure, he frees him against orders and flees with Co and the POW.

They are discovered by Vietnamese troops and cut off by an armed gunboat. The river pirates try to hand them over to the Vietnamese troops. Rambo kills the pirates and destroys the gunboat with an RPG, while the POW and Co Bao swim to safety. Rambo asks Co to stay behind shortly before they reach the extraction point. When the approaching rescue helicopter, with Col. Trautman inside, radios back to base that Rambo has found a POW, Murdock orders the crew to abort the rescue. Trautman, held at gunpoint by the side gunner, is powerless to intercept the crew from abandoning Rambo and the POW. They are both captured and returned to the Vietnamese camp.

When Trautman confronts him, Murdock reveals that he never intended to save any POWs, explaining that Congress expected Rambo to find nothing, and if he did, Murdock would dispose of any photographic evidence or even leave Rambo to die. He removes Trautman from the mission to keep him from helping Rambo.

Rambo understands that the Soviets are assisting the Vietnamese. He is interrogated by the local Soviet liaison, Lieutenant Colonel Podovsky, and his right-hand man, Sergeant Yushin. Having learned from intercepted missives that Rambo's extraction was aborted, Podovsky demands that Rambo broadcast a message to Murdock warning against any further POW rescue missions. Rambo refuses, and as Co infiltrates the camp disguised as a prostitute, he is tortured with electric shocks. Rambo finally relents when the prisoner he tried to rescue is brought in and threatened with eye-gouging. Rambo dials in his secret radio code frequency to contact his base, but uses the opportunity to threaten Murdock, then overpowers his captors and escapes the camp with Co's help. Rambo agrees to take Co to the United States, and they kiss. As they start moving again, a small Vietnamese force attacks the pair and Co is killed. An enraged Rambo guns down the soldiers and buries Co in the mud.

Rambo, using his knife and bow, systematically dispatches the Soviet and Vietnamese soldiers sent after him, using an explosive arrow to blow up the Vietnamese officer who killed Co. After surviving a barrel bomb dropped by Sgt. Yushin's helicopter, Rambo clambers aboard and throws him out of the cabin to his death. Rambo takes control of the helicopter and lays waste to the prison camp using rockets and machine gun fire, before extracting the POWs and flying towards friendly territory in Thailand.

Podovsky, pursuing in a Hind helicopter gunship, fires at Rambo's chopper, seemingly disabling it. When the gunship moves in, Rambo, who had faked the crash of his helicopter, uses a rocket launcher to destroy the gunship, killing Podovsky. After returning to base with the POWs, Rambo confronts Murdock with his knife, demanding that Murdock rescue the remaining POWs. Trautman tries to convince Rambo to return home, now that he has been pardoned. Rambo refuses, saying that he only wants his country to love its soldiers as much as its soldiers love it, and walks off.

Cast 

 Sylvester Stallone as John J. Rambo 
 Richard Crenna as Colonel Sam Trautman
 Charles Napier as Major Marshall Roger T. Murdock
 Steven Berkoff as Lieutenant Colonel Sergei T. Podovsky
 Julia Nickson as Agent Co Phuong Bao
 Martin Kove as Michael Reed Ericson
 George Cheung as Lieutenant Tay 
 Andy Wood as Banks
 William Ghent as Captain Vinh 
 Voyo Goric as Sergeant Yushin 
 Dana Lee as Captain Trong Kinh 
 Steve Williams as Lifer

Production

Development and writing 
Development of a sequel to First Blood began when Carolco Pictures sold foreign distribution rights to distributors in Europe and Japan in 1983, initially scheduling the film for a December 1984 release. It was later rescheduled for August 1, 1985. Producers wanted Rambo to have a partner for the POW rescue mission. They wanted John Travolta to play Rambo's sidekick, but Stallone vetoed the idea. Lee Marvin (who had been considered for the role of Colonel Trautman in the first film) was offered the role of Marshall Murdock, but declined, and the role was given to Charles Napier.

Then up-and-coming screenwriter Kevin Jarre had written a story treatment that was liked by both the producers and Stallone. Jarre later recalled in an interview in the documentary Tinsel – The Lost Movie About Hollywood:I wrote the first draft of Rambo. And I just did it, I was living on dog food at the time and I, you know, I needed a gig and I wanted to finish a spec script I was writing. And you know, they called, Stallone called me in and they had this idea about what they should do in the sequel to First Blood and I said, "Well, how about if maybe he searches for POWs in Southeast Asia and back in Vietnam? He said, "Great, let’s do it."

James Cameron was then hired to pen a first draft of the screenplay, which he was concurrently writing along with The Terminator and Aliens, both of which he would go on to direct. Cameron had been recommended by David Giler, who did some uncredited script work on the first film. Cameron's first draft was titled First Blood II: The Mission. According to Cameron, his script had the same basic structure of the first film, but was more violent than its predecessor. Cameron was quoted in an October 1986 issue of Monsterland magazine: "It was quite a different film from FIRST BLOOD, apart from the continuation of the Rambo character. The first one was set in a small town, it had a different social consciousness from the second one, which was a very broad, stylized adventure. It was a little more violent in its execution than I had in mind in the writing."

Following Cameron’s initial draft, Stallone took over scriptwriting duties, creating a final draft. Jarre received sole story credit, while Stallone and Cameron were credited for the screenplay.

Stallone later recalled: 

Before filming started, Stallone went through torturous trainings to build the perfect musculature. Writer David J. Moore said in the 2019 documentary film In Search of the Last Action Heroes: "Here's a guy who went against the grain in everything that he ever did. Here's a guy who transformed himself, literally; he chiseled his own body into this statuesque, muscular specimen."

Filming 
The film was shot between June and August 1984 on location in the state of Guerrero, Mexico, and Thailand. While vacationing in Acapulco, Ron South was hired on as assistant editor and his film career began. During filming, special effects man Clifford P Wenger, Jr. was accidentally killed during one of the film's waterfall explosions, when he lost his footing and fell to his death.

Music 

The musical score was composed by Jerry Goldsmith, conducting the British National Philharmonic Orchestra, although Goldsmith also made heavy use of electronic synthesized elements. The main song is sung by Stallone's brother, singer-songwriter Frank Stallone. Record label Varèse Sarabande issued the original soundtrack album.

 Main Title (2:12)
 Preparations (1:16)
 The Jump (3:18)
 The Snake (1:48)
 Stories (3:26)
 The Cage (3:55)
 Betrayed (4:22)
 Escape from Torture (3:39)
 Ambush (2:45)
 Revenge (6:14)
 Bowed Down (1:04)
 Pilot Over (1:52)
 Home Flight (3:01)
 Day by Day (2:06)
 Peace in Our Life – music by Frank Stallone, Peter Schless, and Jerry Goldsmith; lyrics by Frank Stallone; performed by Frank Stallone (3:18)

As released in the United Kingdom by That's Entertainment Records (the British licensee for Varèse Sarabande at the time), the UK version placed "Peace in Our Life" between "Betrayed" and "Escape from Torture", thus making "Day by Day" the final track.

In 1999, Silva America released an expanded edition with the cues in film order.

 Main Title (2:14)
 The Map (1:09)
 Preparations (1:18)
 The Jump (3:19)
 The Snake (1:49)
 The Pirates (1:29)
 Stories (3:27)
 The Camp/Forced Entry (2:24)
 The Cage (3:57)
 River Crash/The Gunboat (3:37)
 Betrayed (4:24)
 Bring Him Up/The Eyes (2:06)
 Escape from Torture (3:41)
 Ambush (2:47)
 Revenge (6:16)
 Bowed Down (1:06)
 Pilot Over (1:54)
 Village Raid/Helicopter Flight (4:55)
 Home Flight (3:02)
 Day By Day (2:08)
 Peace in Our Life (3:19) – Frank Stallone

Release

Marketing 
Unusually for the time, a teaser trailer for Rambo: First Blood Part II—then titled First Blood Part II: The Mission—was released in 3,000 theaters in the summer of 1984, over a year before the scheduled release date of August 1, 1985, and several months before any footage for the film was completed. Producer Mario Kassar arranged this to capitalize on the popularity of the first film. The film was also marketed through merchandising, with posters of Rambo selling rapidly. Although the film was rated R and directed at adults, tie-in toys were created for it.

Home media 
The video sold 425,000 units, a record for a tape with a retail price of $79.95.

Rambo: First Blood Part II was released on DVD on November 23, 2004. A Blu-ray release followed on May 23, 2008. Rambo: First Blood Part II was released on 4K UHD Blu-ray on November 13, 2018.

Reception

Box office 
Rambo: First Blood Part II opened in the United States on May 22, 1985, in a then-record 2,074 theaters, becoming the first film to be released to over 2,000 theaters in the United States, and was the number one film that weekend, grossing $20,176,217. Overall, the film grossed $150,415,432 in the US and Canada, and $149,985,000 internationally, for a worldwide total of $300,400,432. The movie broke various international box office records. It set an opening weekend record in the United Kingdom with a gross of £1,085,513 from 322 screens, surpassing the record set by E.T. the Extra-Terrestrial. In France, the film had a record opening day with 269,564 admissions and a record week with 2,075,238 admissions.

Critical response 
On Rotten Tomatoes, the film has an approval rating of  based on  reviews. The site's consensus is "First Blood Part II offers enough mayhem to satisfy genre fans, but remains a regressive sequel that turns its once-compelling protagonist into just another muscled action berserker." On Metacritic the film has a weighted average score of 47 out of 100 based on reviews from 15 critics, indicating "mixed or average reviews".

Vincent Canby of The New York Times called the film "almost as opportunistic as the Congressman it pretends to abhor. In spite of everything it says, it's much less interested in the M.I.A. question than it is in finding a topical frame for the kind of action-adventure film in which Mr. Stallone — his torso and his vacant stare — can do what his fans like best. That is, fight, outwit and kill, usually all by himself, dozens of far-better armed but lesser mortals." Variety wrote, "The charade on the screen, which is not pulled off, is to accept that the underdog Rambo character, albeit with the machine-gun wielding help of an attractive Vietnamese girl, can waste hordes of Viet Cong and Red Army contingents en route to hauling POWs to a Thai air base in a smoking Russian chopper with only a facial scar (from a branding iron-knifepoint) marring his tough figure. You never even see him eating in this fantasy, as if his body feeds on itself." Gene Siskel of the Chicago Tribune gave the film three stars out of four and called it "very good at what it does, but what it does isn't always that good", referring to the depiction of the enemy as going "back to the image of the Yellow Peril, to the notion that white is right and other colors are wrong." Michael Wilmington of the Los Angeles Times wrote, "If a character can seemingly do anything, it's hard to feel tension or concern about his fate. (At least Superman had kryptonite.) We are left with nothing but detached aesthetic appreciation: watching Rambo race through several million dollars worth of explosions and aerial attacks, coruscant fireballs billowing everywhere and bodies flying hither and yon. Except for anyone irretrievably into violent power fantasies, this will probably soon pall." Pauline Kael commented in The New Yorker, "The director, George P. Costmatos, gives this near-psychotic material—a mixture of Catholic iconography and Soldier of Fortune pulp—a veneer of professionalism, but the looniness is always there." Paul Attanasio of The Washington Post wrote, "At best, Rambo: First Blood Part II is a crudely effective right-wing rabble-rouser, the artistic equivalent of carpet bombing—you don't know whether to cheer or run for cover. At worst, it's a tribute to Sylvester Stallone, by Sylvester Stallone, starring Sylvester Stallone."

The film is listed in Golden Raspberry Award founder John Wilson's book The Official Razzie Movie Guide as one of The 100 Most Enjoyably Bad Movies Ever Made.

Accolades

Legacy 
The film is referenced in the 1985 The Golden Girls episode "On Golden Girls". Female characters seem to be aroused by John Rambo's muscular physique, and Sophia Petrillo says: "I sat through it twice. You'll love it! He sweats like a pig and he doesn't put his shirt on!"

Other media

Sequel 

A sequel titled Rambo III, was released in 1988.

Novelization 
David Morrell, author of First Blood, the novel the first Rambo film is based on, wrote a novelization called Rambo: First Blood Part II.

Video games 
A tie-in video game called Rambo was produced for ZX Spectrum, Amstrad CPC and Commodore 64. There was also Rambo for NES, as well as Rambo: First Blood Part II for Master System. MSX and DOS games were based on the film. Sega adapted some of the battle scenes in the film for the 2008 arcade game Rambo. In 2014 Rambo: The Video Game, based on the first three Rambo films, was released.

The 1986 arcade run and gun video game Ikari Warriors was intended by its developer SNK to be an official licensed adaptation of Rambo. However, they were initially unable to acquire the rights to the film. This resulted in the game's title being changed to Ikari, referencing part of the film's Japanese title, Rambo: Ikari no Dasshutsu ("Rambo: The Furious Escape"). After the game made its North American debut at an arcade game expo, they managed to get in touch with Sylvester Stallone about acquiring the rights to the film. However, it was too late by that point, as the game had already become popularly known by its Japanese Ikari title among arcade players in Japan and North America, which led to the game's official release as Ikari Warriors in North America. Stallone was friends with SNK's president at the time, and owned an Ikari Warriors arcade cabinet.

In popular culture 
 Missing in Action, an American film inspired by Rambo: First Blood Part II
 Strike Commando, an Italian film described as an imitation of Rambo: First Blood Part II
 Hot Shots! Part Deux, an American parody film of Rambo: First Blood Part II and Rambo III with the colonel role reprised by Richard Crenna
 Second Blood, a Kuwaiti action film inspired by Rambo: First Blood Part II
 In UHF, a 1989 comedy-parody film, low-budget television station manager George Newman has a fantasy in which he envisions himself as a Rambo-type soldier on mission to rescue Stanley Spadowski from a rival station owner's goons. The fantasy sequence is a parody of action sequences in Rambo: First Blood Part II. Stallone had initially agreed to make a cameo appearance in the sequence, but ultimately declined to do so.

References

External links 

 
 
 
 

1985 films
1980s English-language films
Vietnamese-language films
1985 action films
1980s adventure films
American action films
American anti-communist propaganda films
American sequel films
Cold War films
Films about missing people
Films set in 1985
Films set in prison
Films set in Thailand
Films set in the United States
Films set in Vietnam
Films shot in Mexico
Golden Raspberry Award winning films
Rambo (franchise)
Films about United States Army Special Forces
TriStar Pictures films
Carolco Pictures films
StudioCanal films
Films scored by Jerry Goldsmith
Films directed by George P. Cosmatos
Films with screenplays by James Cameron
Films with screenplays by Sylvester Stallone
Vietnam War films
Vietnam War prisoner of war films
Films produced by Buzz Feitshans
1980s American films